Leonardt Ltd. (formerly D. Leonardt & Co.) is an English manufacturing company that specializes in finishing of metal components, manufacturing products such as corners for stationery such as leathergoods, photograph albums, menu covers, pattern and carpet books, binders and portfolios.

The company also produced writing implements that included dip and fountain nibs, ballpoint pens, pen holders and mechanical pencils, which set Leonardt as one of the oldest manufacturers of dip pens, having produced them since its establishment in 1856.

History 

The company was founded in 1856 by Diedrich Leonardt to manufacture dip pens. After two large expansions led by Leonardt in 1863 and 1867, D Leonardt & Co. developed large export market in South America and Eastern Europe, and produced pens for the King of Italy. The manufactured pens were considered to be of high quality and included their famous patent ballpoint pens, such as the "Automatic Wonder Pen", a new type of fountain pen introduced in 1871.

Despite most manufacturers of nibs established in Birmingham having since closed their factories, Leonardt & Co. is one of the few companies that have remained in the industry since its founding, although the company ceased to produce pens. The only British company that currently manufactures dip pens is British Pens Ltd. through its brands Joseph Gillott's and William Mitchell.

Pen models 
Some of the dip pen models manufactured by Leonardt were:

 6H - Extra fine drawing nib, nickel
 30 ("Point"), nickel
 33 ("Copying"), nickel
 40 ("Pumpking"), fine, blue finish
 41 ("Crown"), fine point, with collar body
 63 ("School"), nickel
 70 ("Ornamental") - Oblique with top reservoir, bronze
 111 - Nickel and gilding
 251 ("Scroll") - for decorative borders, gilding
 256 ("Drawing") - gilt, nickel, and bronze
 260/265 ("Poster") - Flat-shape pen, brass and gilding
 300 ("Ball point"), nickel
 400 ("Ornamental"), polished
 516 ("Eureka") - Spherical point
 518 ("Lithographic"), bright
 526 - Spherical point
 700 - Extra fine drawing nib, nickel
 800/801 ("Mapping") - Crowquill type, extrafine, bronze
 2300 ("Round") - Traditional calligraphy, nickel
 "Index" - Decorative, bronze 
 "Principal" - Extrafine, bronze
 "Shakespeare" - Decorative, bronze, nickel and gilding

Gallery

References

External links

 
 Dip pen nibs catalog (archived, 2 Mar 2007)

Companies established in 1856
Manufacturing companies based in Birmingham, West Midlands
English brands
Writing implement manufacturers
Pen manufacturers